Polygnathidae is an extinct family of conodonts.

References

External links 

 
 Polygnathidae at fossilworks.org (retrieved 1 May 2016)

Ozarkodinida families